Kaya is a village in the District of Fethiye, Muğla Province, Turkey. As of 2000 it had a population of 1,524 people. Kaya was substantially depopulated in the 1920s population exchange between Greece and Turkey. Kaya is identified by the editors of the Barrington Atlas of the Greek and Roman World as the location of the ancient city of Karmylessos.

References

 Yerelnet
 Kayakoy Ghost Town - Village in Fethiye Turkey

Villages in Fethiye District